Kaisersesch is a Verbandsgemeinde ("collective municipality") in the district Cochem-Zell, in Rhineland-Palatinate, Germany. The seat of the Verbandsgemeinde is in Kaisersesch. On 1 July 2014 it was expanded with 8 municipalities from the former Verbandsgemeinde Treis-Karden.

The Verbandsgemeinde Kaisersesch consists of the following Ortsgemeinden ("local municipalities"):

{|
|valign=top|
 Binningen 
 Brachtendorf 
 Brieden 
 Brohl 
 Dünfus 
 Düngenheim 
 Eppenberg 
 Eulgem 
 Forst (Eifel) 
 Gamlen 
 Hambuch 
 Hauroth 
 Illerich 
|valign=top|
 Kaifenheim 
 Kail 
 Kaisersesch1, 2
 Kalenborn 
 Landkern 
 Laubach 
 Leienkaul 
 Masburg
 Möntenich 
 Müllenbach 
 Roes 
 Urmersbach 
 Zettingen  
|}

Verbandsgemeinde in Rhineland-Palatinate